Wadud Bhuiyan (born 5 January 1965) is a Bangladeshi politician. He was the first Bengali politician to have been elected to the parliament from a Chittagong Hill Tracts constituency of Bangladesh. Bhuiyan was elected twice as the member of the Jatiyo Sangshad (Bangladesh Parliament) from Khagrachari constituency respectively in the 6th and 8th National Parliamentary Elections. In addition, he served as Chairman of the Chittagong Hill Tracts Development Board from 2002 to 2006. He currently holds the posts of assistant employment secretary of Central Executive Committee of the Bangladesh Nationalist Party (BNP) and president of the opposition party's Khagrachari local unit as well.

Early life and education
Bhuiyan was born on 5 January 1965 at Ramgarh Upazila, Khagrachari District. He obtained his M.S.S degree on Sociology from Chittagong University in 1986.

Political career

Student politics 

Bhuiyan was active in student politics at Chittagong University. He was the convener, which was equivalent to the post of president, of the Chittagong University unit of Jatiyatabadi Chhatra Dal, the student wing of BNP, from 1987 to 1989. Concurrently, he served as the president of the Ramgarh unit of the student organization from 1980 to 1990.

Public office 

In 1989, he was elected as the counselor of the Khagrachari Hill District Council with a majority of few thousands votes. He later resigned, along with another counselor, from the post, protesting the then-chairman Samiran Dewan's alleged corruption. In the 6th parliamentary election, in 1996, he was nominated and elected as the candidate of the Bangladesh Nationalist Party (BNP) from Khagrachari constituency.

In the 9th parliamentary election, in 2001, he was again nominated as the candidate of the BNP and elected by a significant margin.

He had also participated in the 5th (1991) and 7th (1996) parliamentary elections as the sole candidate of BNP, only to have been defeated by comparatively close margins.

In 2001, he was appointed as a member of the parliamentary standing committee on Ministry of Chittagong Hill Tracts Affairs, with BNP chairperson and Prime Minister Khaleda Zia heading the committee.

In 2002, he was appointed as the chairman of the Chittagong Hill Tracts Development Board, a government agency established in 1978 by Ziaur Rahman, the founder of the BNP and then-President of Bangladesh.

In the 10th parliamentary election, he couldn't participate due to his imprisonment during military influenced then-caretaker government's period for misappropriating public funds. In the last parliamentary election held in 2018, his candidacy was revoked by the High Court as well.

Political activism 
He is known as the leader of the people with Bengali lineage living in the Chittagong Hill Tracts. He was also known for his vocal position to the militant activities of Shanti Bahini, the rebellious military wing of the Parbatya Chattagram Jana Sanghati Samiti (PCJSS) that operated until the Chittagong Hill Tracts Peace Accord was signed between the Bangladesh government and the PCJSS in 1997.

Bhuiyan was the architect behind the foundation of Parbatya Chattagram Sama-Odhikar Andolon (Chittagong Hill Tracts Equal-Rights Movement), an organization which demanded an equal share for Bengali in any dispensation intended for ethnic people.

Arrests
He was also arrested during the caretaker government's period in 2007. A special court in Chittagong sentenced him to 20 years in jail. However, this conviction order, along with seven orders, was later stayed by the High Court, and he was granted bail.

References

1965 births
Living people
People from Khagrachhari District
Bangladesh Nationalist Party politicians
University of Chittagong alumni
21st-century Bangladeshi politicians
6th Jatiya Sangsad members
8th Jatiya Sangsad members
20th-century Bengalis
21st-century Bengalis